Nomcebo Nothule Zikode (born 1985) is a South African Grammy Award winning singer and songwriter. Born in Hammarsdale, Zikode was a backing singer for several years. She collaborated with DJ Ganyani on their hit single "Emazulwini" (2018).

Having signed a record deal with Open Mic Production, she co-wrote and was featured on Master KG's chart-topping single "Jerusalema" (2019), which debuted #1 on Billboard Music charts and Apple Music charts .

Her debut album Xola Moya Wam was released in 2020, containing two successful singles, "Xola Moya wam" and "Bayabuza".

Life and career

Early life and education
Zikode was born in Hammarsdale, Provice of Natal.
She matriculated at Ukusa High School, later enrolling at Havatech College, obtaining an information technology degree.

Career beginnings
After moving from home to pursue a career in music, she worked mostly as a backing singer for more than fifteen years. She worked with South African artistes, including Deborah Fraser, Zahara, Lundi Tyamara, and Nhlanhla Nciza.

She was signed by Ganyani Entertainment, providing vocals for songs including "NTO", "Jabulile", and "Emazulwini", which received a nomination for Record of the Year at the SAMA awards. As she did not own the songs, she was not permitted to perform them without the consent of the label.

Having signed record deal with Open Mic Productions, she gained worldwide popularity after working with Master KG on his 2019 hit single "Jerusalema" and later remixed by Burna Boy, debuted #1 on Billboard Music charts.

2020-present:Xola Moya Wam
On August 14, 2020, her single "Xola Moya Wam" featuring Master KG was released as album's lead single. The song was certified gold certification by Recording Industry of South Africa in the first 2 weeks. The single peaked number 1 on Apple Music Chart & iTunes Chart.
In early August, album pre-order were made available.

Her debut studio album Xola Moya Wam was released on August 21, 2020. It features  Master KG, Makhadzi and Bongo Beats. The album was certified platinum after a month of its release with sales of 150 000 copies.

In 2020, Zikode signed a global record deal with Sony/ATV Music.

On December 3, 2020, she won at the 1st KZN Entertainment Awards of KZN Entertainment Awards for Best Female Artist category.

At the 27th South African Music Awards, Xola Moya Wam was nominated as Best Dance Album.

On July 29, 2021, she went on European tour. In late 2021, she made her debut on screens as guest appearance on Love and Hip Hop franchise.

Controversy 
In November 2019, she was featured on "Jerusalem" single by Master KG and went viral in early 2020, Burna Boy released a remix.
On July 11, 2021, Zikode revealed that she wasn't paid for her feature on the song by her label Open Mic Productions.

Endorsement 
In 2021, Zikode was named a Good Ambassador for AIDONIC.

Tours

Headlining 
 European Tour (2021)

Discography

Studio albums
  Xola Moya Wam (2020)

Singles featured in

Others
 "Jerusalema" (remix) - (Master KG feat. Burna Boy & Nomcebo Zikode) (2020)
 "Jerusalema" (remix) - Master KG feat. Micro TDH & Greeicy & Nomcebo Zikode (2020)

Personal life
Zikode is married and has two children.

Awards and nominations

References

External links
 

1985 births
Living people
21st-century South African women singers
People from eThekwini Metropolitan Municipality
Sony Music artists
Grammy Award winners